The Order of the Virtues (or Nishan al-Kamal) is a female Egyptian order of knighthood, as an award for merit.

History 
The Order was founded in 1915 and reestablished under the Republic in 1953.

Classes 
The order is composed of the following classes of merit :

 Supreme Class
 1st Class
 2nd Class
 3rd Class

Insignia 
 The ribbon is light grey with gold edges.

Notable recipients 
 Elisabeth of Bavaria, Queen of Belgium : Supreme class.
 Queen Elizabeth II of the United Kingdom : Supreme class (1948)
 Siti Hartinah, First Lady of Indonesia : Supreme class (1977)
 Diana, Princess of Wales : Supreme class (1981)
 Queen Sofía of Spain : Supreme class (1997) 
 Infanta Cristina of Spain : Supreme class (2000)
 Queen Aishwarya of Nepal : Supreme class (1974)
 Queen Noor of Jordan : Supreme class (1989)
 Queen Fawzia of Iran : Supreme class (1939)
 Queen Nazli of Egypt : Supreme class (1917)
 Queen Farida of Egypt : Supreme class (1938)
 Queen Narriman of Egypt : Supreme class (1951)
 Queen Tadj ol-Molouk of Iran : Supreme class (1939)
 Princess Faiza of Egypt : Supreme class
 Princess Faika of Egypt : Supreme class
 Princess Fathia of Egypt : Supreme class
 Princess Noal Zaher of Afghanistan : Supreme class
 Princess Fawzia-Latifa of Egypt : Supreme class
 Huda Sha'arawi: Supreme Class

References and sources 
 World Medals Index, Republic of Egypt: The Order of the Virtues

Virtues (Egypt), Order of the
Virtues (Egypt), Order of the
Virtues (Egypt), Order of the
Awards established in 1915
1915 establishments in Egypt